Hjalmart Nørregaard Andersen (11 October 1889 – 23 January 1974) was a Danish gymnast who competed in the 1912 Summer Olympics. He was part of the Danish team, which won the bronze medal in the gymnastics men's team, free system event.

References

External links
profile

1889 births
1974 deaths
Danish male artistic gymnasts
Gymnasts at the 1912 Summer Olympics
Olympic gymnasts of Denmark
Olympic bronze medalists for Denmark
Olympic medalists in gymnastics
Medalists at the 1912 Summer Olympics